Lukas Kilström (born April 18, 1990) is a Swedish professional ice hockey defenseman currently playing for Brynäs IF of the Swedish Hockey League (SHL).

Playing career
Kilström has played in Södertälje SK's junior team and two seasons in Södertälje's A-team.  He made his professional debut with Södertälje SK in the Elitserien during the 2008–09 season.

After the 2010–11 season, following Södertälje's relegation out of the Elite, he chose to remain in the league in signing a two-year contract with Lulea HF

References

External links

1990 births
Living people
Brynäs IF players
Luleå HF players
Södertälje SK players
Swedish ice hockey defencemen
People from Södertälje
Sportspeople from Stockholm County